Neural cell adhesion molecule L1-like protein also known as close homolog of L1 (CHL1) is a protein that in humans is encoded by the CHL1 gene.

CHL1 is a cell adhesion molecule closely related to the L1. In melanocytic cells CHL1 gene expression may be regulated by MITF, and can act as a helicase protein during the interphase stage of mitosis.

The protein, however, has dynamic localisation, meaning that it has not only multiple roles in the cell, but also various locations.

References

Further reading

External links